Linda Carter (born April 1963) is an American Democratic Party politician. A resident of Plainfield, she has represented the 22nd Legislative District in the New Jersey General Assembly since taking office in 2018 to fill the seat that had been vacant since the death of Jerry Green.

Political career 
Carter served on the Board of Chosen Freeholders for Union County from 2011 to 2017, becoming the Board's chairwoman in 2013. She also served as a commissioner of the Middlesex County Utilities Authority, commissioner of the Raritan Valley Rail Coalition, and at-large councilwoman for the 1st and 4th wards in Plainfield. In June 2018, Rebecca Williams was appointed on an interim basis to fill the freeholder seat expiring in December 2019 that had been held by Carter.

New Jersey Assembly 
Carter was appointed in May 2018 to fill the vacant seat left following the death of Jerry Green the previous month after 26 years of service. Carter subsequently won the special election to serve the rest of Green's term on November 6, 2018.

Committees
Higher Education, Vice-Chair
Science, Innovation and Technology, Vice-Chair
Law and Public Safety

District 22 
Each of the 40 districts in the New Jersey Legislature has one representative in the New Jersey Senate and two members in the New Jersey General Assembly. The representatives from the 22nd District for the 2022—23 Legislative Session are:
Senator Nicholas Scutari (D) 
Assemblywoman Linda S. Carter (D) 
Assemblyman James J. Kennedy (D)

Legislation 
In the 2018-2019 legislative session, Carter was primary sponsor on the following bills signed into law:

 A-4073 Designates portion of State Highway Route 27 in Union County as "Jerry Green Memorial Highway."
 A-4705 Establishes New Jersey Food Waste Task Force to make recommendations concerning food waste in New Jersey.
 A-4936 Establishes maternal health care pilot program to evaluate shared decision-making tool developed by DOH and used by hospitals providing maternity services, and by birthing centers.

Electoral history

New Jersey Assembly

References

External links
Legislative webpage
Ballotpedia

Living people
Democratic Party members of the New Jersey General Assembly
21st-century American politicians
Politicians from Plainfield, New Jersey
County commissioners in New Jersey
New Jersey city council members
Women state legislators in New Jersey
Women city councillors in New Jersey
21st-century American women politicians
1963 births